It Happened One Sunday is a 1944 British romantic comedy film directed by Karel Lamač and starring Robert Beatty, Barbara White and Marjorie Rhodes. Produced and distributed by Associated British it was shot at Welwyn Studios with sets designed by the art director William C. Andrews. The film was based on the play She Met Him One Sunday by Victor Skutezky.

Synopsis
In the film, an Irish servant girl working in Liverpool mistakenly believes that she has a secret admirer working at a hospital, and while seeking him out accidentally meets and falls in love with a serviceman there. She spends the rest of the day around Liverpool with him and they eventually decide to marry.

Cast
 Robert Beatty as Tom Stevens
 Barbara White as Moya Malone
 Marjorie Rhodes as Mrs. Buckland
 Ernest Butcher as Mr. Buckland
 Kathryn Beaumont as Jill Buckland
 Judy Kelly as Violet
 Irene Vanbrugh as Mrs. Bellamy
 Kathleen Harrison as Mrs. Purkiss
 Moore Marriott as Porter
 C. V. France as Magistrate
 Marie Ault as Madame
 Brefni O'Rorke as Engineer
 Frederick Piper as Jake
 Philip Green as bandleader

References

Bibliography
 Goble, Alan. The Complete Index to Literary Sources in Film. Walter de Gruyter, 1999.

External links

1944 films
1944 romantic comedy films
British romantic comedy films
Films set in Liverpool
Films directed by Karel Lamač
Seafaring films
Films shot at Welwyn Studios
British black-and-white films
British films based on plays
1940s English-language films
1940s British films